Hu Shih (17 December 1891 – 24 February 1962), also known as Hu Suh in early references, was a Chinese diplomat, essayist, literary scholar, philosopher, and politician. Hu is widely recognized today as a key contributor to Chinese liberalism and language reform in his advocacy for the use of written vernacular Chinese. He was influential in the May Fourth Movement, one of the leaders of China's New Culture Movement, was a president of Peking University, and in 1939 was nominated for a Nobel Prize in literature. He had a wide range of interests such as literature, philosophy, history, textual criticism, and pedagogy. He was also an influential redology scholar and held the famous Jiaxu manuscript for many years until his death.

Biography

Early life 
Hu was born on December 17, 1891, in Shanghai to Hu Chuan and his third wife Feng Shundi. Hu Chuan was a tea merchant who became a public servant, serving in Manchuria, Hainan, and Taiwan. After Hu Shih's birth, Hu Chuan moved to Taiwan to work in 1892, where his wife and Hu Shih joined him in 1893. Shortly before Hu Chuan's death in 1895, right after the outbreak of the First Sino-Japanese War, his wife Feng and the young Hu Shih left Taiwan for their ancestral home in Anhui.  

In January 1904, Hu Shih's family arranged his marriage to Chiang Tung-hsiu. In the same year, Hu and an elder brother moved to Shanghai seeking a "modern" education.

Family legend has it that Hu Shih's ancestors were descended from the last teenage Emperor of Tang China (being different in origin from the rest of the Hu clan), who fled in disguise with a loyal minister of court in 907 to Anhui and eventually took the name as his son.

Academic career 
Hu became a "national scholar" through funds appropriated from the Boxer Indemnity Scholarship Program. On 16 August 1910, he was sent to study agriculture at Cornell University in the U.S. In 1912 he changed his major to philosophy and literature, and was elected to Phi Beta Kappa. After receiving his undergraduate degree, he went to study philosophy at Teachers College, Columbia University, where he was greatly influenced by his professor, John Dewey. Hu became Dewey's translator and a lifelong advocate of pragmatic evolutionary change, helping Dewey in his 1919–1921 lectures series in China. He returned to lecture in Peking University. During his tenure there, he received support from Chen Duxiu, editor of the influential journal New Youth, quickly gaining much attention and influence. Hu soon became one of the leading and influential intellectuals during the May Fourth Movement and later the New Culture Movement.

He quit New Youth in the 1920s and published several political newspapers and journals with his friends. His most important contribution was the promotion of vernacular Chinese in literature to replace Classical Chinese, which was intended to make it easier for the ordinary person to read. The significance of this for Chinese culture was greatas John Fairbank put it, "the tyranny of the classics had been broken". Hu devoted a great deal of energy, however, to rooting his linguistic reforms in China's traditional culture rather than relying on imports from the West. As his biographer Jerome Grieder put it, Hu's approach to China's "distinctive civilization" was "thoroughly critical but by no means contemptuous." For instance, he made a major contribution to the textual study of the Chinese classical novel, especially the 18th century novel Dream of the Red Chamber, as a way of establishing the vocabulary for a modern standardized language. His Peking University colleague Wen Yuan-ning dubbed Hu a "philosophe" for his wide-ranging humanistic interests and expertise.

Public services 
Hu was the ambassador of Republic of China to the U.S. between 1938 and 1942. He was recalled in September 1942 and was replaced by Wei Tao-ming. Hu then served as chancellor of Peking University, which was then called National Peking University, between 1946 and 1948. In 1957, he became the third president of the Academia Sinica in Taipei, a post he retained until his death. He was also chief executive of the Free China Journal, which was eventually shut down for criticizing Chiang Kai-shek.

Death and legacy 
He died of a heart attack in Nankang, Taipei at the age of 70, and was entombed in Hu Shih Park, adjacent to the Academia Sinica campus. That December, Hu Shih Memorial Hall was established in his memory. It is an affiliate of the Institute of Modern History at the Academia Sinica, and includes a museum, his residence, and the park. Hu Shih Memorial Hall offers audio tour guides in Chinese and English for visitors.

Hu Shih's work fell into disrepute in mainland China until a 1986 article, written by Ji Xianlin, "A Few Words for Hu Shih" (为胡适说几句话), advocated acknowledging not only Hu Shih's mistakes, but also his contributions to modern Chinese literature. This article was sufficiently convincing to many scholars that it led to a re-evaluation of the development of modern Chinese literature and the role of Hu Shih. Selection 15 of the Putonghua Proficiency Test is a story about Hu Shih debating the merits of Written vernacular Chinese over Classical Chinese.

Hu Shih Hall at Cornell University is named for him.

Philosophical contributions

Pragmatism 
During his time at Columbia, Hu studied with John Dewey and became a staunch supporter of the Pragmatism school. 

Hu Shih's adoption of Pragmatism is, in fact, a reflection of his own philosophical appeals. Before he encountered Dewey's works, he wrote in his diary that he was in a search of "practical philosophy," instead of deep and obscure philosophies for the survival of the Chinese people. Instead of abstract theories, he was more interested in methodologies (術, shù). Hu viewed Pragmatism as a scientific methodology for the study of philosophy. He greatly appreciated the universality of such a scientific approach because he believed that such a methodology transcends the boundary of culture and therefore can be applied anywhere, including China during his time. Hu Shih was not so interested in the content of Dewey's philosophy, caring rather about the method, the attitude, and the scientific spirit.

Hu Shih saw all ideologies and abstract theories only as hypotheses waiting to be tested. The content of ideologies, Hu believed, was shaped by the background, political environment, and even the personality of the theorist. Thus these theories were confined within their temporality.  Hu felt that only the attitude and spirit of an ideology could be universally applied. Therefore, Hu criticized any dogmatic application of ideologies. After Hu took over as the chief editor at Weekly Commentary in 1919, he and Li Dazhao engaged in a heated debate regarding ideology and problem that was influential among Chinese intellectuals at that time. Hu writes in "A Third Discussion of Problems and Isms":Throughout the literary works and other scholarships of Hu Shih, the presence of Pragmatism as a method is prevalent. Hu Shih consist of using an ill-defined scientific method. He described him own as experiential inductive, verificatory, and evolutionary. Hu Shih was deeply influenced by John Dewey's ideals.

In more details, Hu quotes Dewey's division of thought into five steps.

 a felt difficulty
 its location and definition
 suggestion of possible solution
 development of the suggestions
 further observation and experiment leads to acceptance or rejection.

In fact, Hu saw his life work as a consistent project of practicing the scientific spirit of Pragmatism since science is an attitude, a lifestyle that must be lived.

Skepticism 
For Hu Shih, skepticism and pragmatism are inseparable. In his essay "Introducing My Thoughts", he states that Thomas H. Huxley is the one person, other than Dewey, who most heavily influenced his thoughts. Huxley's agnosticism is the negative precondition to the practical, active problem-solving of Dewey's pragmatism. Huxley's "genetic method" in Hu's writing becomes a "historical attitude," an attitude that ensures one's intellectual independence which also leads to individual emancipation and political freedom.

Chinese intellectual history 
Hu Shih brought the scientific method and the spirit of Skepticism into traditional Chinese textual study (Kaozheng), laying the groundwork for contemporary studies of Chinese intellectual history.

In 1919, Hu Shih published the first volume of An Outline History of Chinese Philosophy; the later portion was never finished. Later scholars of Chinese intellectual history including Feng Youlan and Yu Yingshi agree that Hu's work was revolutionary. Cai Yuanpei, president of Peking University where Hu was teaching at the time, wrote the preface for Outline and pointed out four key features that make Hu's work distinct:

 Method of proving for dates, validity, and perspectives of methodology
 "Cutting off the many schools", meaning that remove all schools before the time of the Warring States and starting with Laozi and Confucius
 Equal treatment for Confucianism, Mohism, Mencius, and Xunzi
 Systematic studies with chronological orders and juxtaposition that present the evolution of theories

Without a doubt, Hu's organisation of classical Chinese philosophy imitated Western philosophical history, but the influence of textual study since the time of the Qing dynasty is still present. Especially for the second point, "cutting off the many schools" is a result of the continuous effort of Qing scholarship around ancient textual studies. Since the validity of the ancient texts is questionable and the content of them obscure, Hu decided to leave them out. In fact, before the publication of Outline, Hu was appointed to be the lecturer of History of Classical Chinese Philosophy. His decision of leaving out pre-Warring States philosophy almost caused a riot among students.

In Outline, other philosophical schools of the Warring States were first treated as equal. Hu did not hold Confucianism as the paradigm while treating other schools as heresy. Rather, Hu saw philosophical values within other schools, even those considered to be anti-Confucian, like Mohism. In 1919, this was considered a significant revolutionary act among intellectuals. Yu Yingshi, a prominent Taiwanese historian on intellectual history even praised Hu for setting up a new paradigm according to Thomas Kuhn's Enlightenment theory.

Despite recognising the revolutionary nature of Hu's work. Feng Youlan, the author of A History of Chinese Philosophy, criticises Hu for adopting a pragmatist framework in Outline. Instead of simply laying out the history of Chinese philosophy, Feng claims that Hu criticises these schools from a pragmatist perspective which makes the reader feel as if "the whole Chinese civilisation is entirely on the wrong track." Feng also disagrees with Hu's extensive effort on researching the validity of the resource text. Feng believes that as long as the work itself is philosophically valuable, its validity is not as significant.

Political views

Individualism, liberalism, and democracy 
Unlike many of his contemporaries who later joined the Socialist camp, liberalism and democracy had been Hu's political beliefs throughout his life. He firmly believed that the world as a whole was heading toward democracy, despite the changing political landscape. Hu defines democracy as a lifestyle in which everyone's value is recognized, and everyone has the freedom to develop a lifestyle of individualism. For Hu, individual achievement does not contradict societal good. In fact, individual achievement contributes to overall social progress, a view that differs from the so-called "selfish individualism." In his essay, "ImmortalityMy Religion," Hu stresses that although individuals eventually perish physically, one's soul and the effect one has on society are immortal. Therefore, Hu's individualism is a lifestyle in which people are independent and yet social.

Hu sees individual contributions as crucial and beneficial to the system of democracy. In "A Second Discussion on Nation-Building and Autocracy", Hu comments that an autocratic system needs professionals to manage it while democracy relies on the wisdom of the people. When different people's lived experiences come together, no elite politician is needed for coordination, and therefore democracy is, in fact, easy to practice with people who lack political experience. He calls democracy "naive politics", a political system that can help cultivate those who participate in it.

Hu also equates democracy with freedom, a freedom that is made possible by tolerance. In a democratic system, people should be free from any political persecution as well as any public pressure. In his 1959 essay "Tolerance and Freedom," Hu Shih stressed the importance of tolerance and claimed that "tolerance is the basis of freedom." In a democratic society, the existence of opposition must be tolerated. Minority rights are respected and protected. People must not destroy or silence the opposition.

The Chinese root of democracy 
A large portion of Hu Shih's scholarship in his later years is dedicated to finding a Chinese root for democracy and liberalism. Many of his writings, including Historic "Tradition for a Democratic China," "The Right to Doubt in Ancient Chinese Thought," "Authority and Freedom in the Ancient Asian World" make a similar claim that the democratic spirit is always present within the Chinese tradition. Some of his claims include:

 A thoroughly democratized social structure by an equal inheritance system among sons and the right to rebel under oppressive regimes.
 Widespread accessibility of political participation through civil service exams.
 Intragovernmental criticism and censorial control formalized by governmental institutions and the Confucian tradition of political criticism.

Constitutionalism and human rights movement 
In 1928, Hu along with Xu Zhimo, Wen Yiduo, Chen Yuan and Liang Shiqiu founded the monthly journal Crescent Moon, named after Tagore's prose verse. In March 1929, Shanghai Special Representatives of National Party Chen De proposed to punish any "anti-revolutionary" without due process. Hu Shih responded fiercely with an article in Crescent Moon titled "Human Rights and Law". In the article, Hu called for the establishment of a written constitution that protects the rights of citizens, especially from the ruling government. The government must be held accountable to the constitution. Later in "When Can We Have ConstitutionA Question for The Outline of National Reconstruction", Hu criticized the Nationalist government for betraying the ideal of Constitutionalism in The Outline of National Reconstruction. Rejecting Sun Yat-sen's claim that people are incapable of self-rule, Hu considered democracy itself a form of political education. The legitimacy and the competency of people participating in the political process comes from their lived experience.

Criticism of the Chinese Communist Party after 1949 
In the early 1950s, the Chinese Communist Party launched a years-long campaign criticizing Hu Shih's thoughts. In response, Hu published many essays in English attacking the political legitimacy of the Chinese Communist Party.

In the writing field, Lu Xun and Hu were two most different examples representing two different political parties. The political differences between the Nationalist Party and the Chinese Communist Party led to significantly different evaluations of the two writers. As a supporter of the Communist Party, Lu Xun was hailed by its leader Mao Zedong as ''the greatest and most courageous fighter of the new cultural army.'' By contrast, Hu Shih was criticised by Communist-leaning historians as ''the earliest, the most persistent and most uncompromising enemy of Chinese Marxism and socialist thought.'' The different evaluations of the two different writers show the complexity between two different political parties in modern China.
Hu's opposition to the Chinese Communist Party was essentially an ideological conflict. As a supporter of Pragmatism, Hu believed that social changes could only happen incrementally. Revolution or any ideologies that claim to solve social problems once and for all are not possible. Such a perspective was present in his early writing, as in the problem versus isms debate. He often quotes John Dewey: "progress is not a wholesale matter, but a retail job, to be contracted for and executed in section." Another ideological conflict came with his individualism. Hu affirms the individual's right as independent from the collective. The individual has the right to develop freely and diversely without political suppression in the name of uniformity. He writes in "The Conflict of Ideologies":In contrast to a Marxist conception of history, Hu's vision of history is pluralistic and particular. In his talk with American economist Charles A. Beard, recorded in his diary, Hu believed the making of history is only coincidental. Since he is a proponent of reformism, pluralism, individualism, and skepticism, Hu's philosophy is irreconcilable with Communist ideology. Hu's later scholarship around the Chinese root of liberalism and democracy is consistent with his anti-CCP writings. In a later manuscript titled "Communism, Democracy, and Cultural Pattern," Hu constructs three arguments from Chinese intellectual history, especially from Confucian and Taoist traditions, to combat the authoritative rule of the Chinese Communist Party:

Therefore, Hu regards the dictatorship of the Chinese Communist Party as not only "unhistorical," but also "un-Chinese."

Writings
Hu was well known as the primary advocate for the literary revolution of the era, a movement which aimed to replace scholarly classical Chinese in writing with the vernacular spoken language, and to cultivate and stimulate new forms of literature. In an article originally published in New Youth in January 1917 titled "A Preliminary Discussion of Literature Reform" (文學改良芻議), Hu originally emphasized eight guidelines that all Chinese writers should take to heart in writing:

 Write with substance. By this, Hu meant that literature should contain real feeling and human thought. This was intended to be a contrast to the recent poetry with rhymes and phrases that Hu saw as being empty.
 Do not imitate the ancients. Literature should not be written in the styles of long ago, but rather in the modern style of the present era.
 Respect grammar. Hu did not elaborate at length on this point, merely stating that some recent forms of poetry had neglected proper grammar.
 Reject melancholy. Recent young authors often chose grave pen names, and wrote on such topics as death. Hu rejected this way of thinking as being unproductive in solving modern problems.
 Eliminate old clichés. The Chinese language has always had numerous four-character sayings and phrases used to describe events. Hu implored writers to use their own words in descriptions, and deplored those who did not.
 Do not use allusions. By this, Hu was referring to the practice of comparing present events with historical events even when there is no meaningful analogy.
 Do not use couplets or parallelism. Though these forms had been pursued by earlier writers, Hu believed that modern writers first needed to learn the basics of substance and quality, before returning to these matters of subtlety and delicacy.
 Do not avoid popular expressions or popular forms of characters. This rule, perhaps the most well-known, ties in directly with Hu's belief that modern literature should be written in the vernacular, rather than in Classical Chinese. He believed that this practice had historical precedents, and led to greater understanding of important texts.
 Huh Shih is known for his famous quote on India, "India conquered and dominated China culturally for 20 centuries without ever having to send a single soldier across her border"

In April of 1918, Hu published a second article in New Youth, this one titled "Constructive Literary Revolution – A Literature of National Speech". In it, he simplified the original eight points into just four:

 Speak only when you have something to say. This is analogous to the first point above.
 Speak what you want to say and say it in the way you want to say it. This combines points two through six above.
 Speak what is your own and not that of someone else. This is a rewording of point seven.
 Speak in the language of the time in which you live. This refers again to the replacement of Classical Chinese with the vernacular language.

The following excerpt is from a poem titled Dream and Poetry, written in vernacular Chinese by Hu. It illustrates how he applied those guidelines to his own work.

His prose included works like The Life of Mr. Close Enough, a piece criticizing Chinese society which centers around the extremely common Chinese language phrase '', which means something like "close enough" or "just about right":

His works are listed chronologically at the Hu Shih Memorial Hall website.

Hu Shih versus Zhang Shizhao 
Hu Shih is considered one of the key leaders of the Chinese language reform and the vernacular style of writing articles. The opposite style of writing is Classical Chinese, and one of the key leaders of this language was Zhang Shizhao. Hu Shih and Zhang Shizhao had only a ten-year age difference, but the men seemed to be of differing generations, and the two were both friends and enemies.

In October 1919, after visiting Wu Luzhen in China, Hu Shih said with emotion: "In the last ten years, only deceased personalities like Song Jiaoren, Cai E, and Wu Luzhen have been able to maintain their great reputation. The true features of living personalities are soon detected. This is because the times change too quickly. If a living personality does not try his utmost, he falls behind and soon becomes 'against the time''' In Hu Shih's ideals, only dead people can hold their reputation; the world will soon know the real value and personality of a person if they do not follow the times. They will fall back in time soon if they are not trying to find changes that encourage writers in old China to follow the new revolution and start using the new vernacular style of writing. They cannot stay in the old style; otherwise, they will fall back in time. Furthermore, Hu Shih meant that China needed more new things.

One odd thing about Hu Shih and Zhang Shizhao is that Zhang was the biggest 'enemy' of the vernacular style, According to Liang Souming: "Lin Shu and Zhang Shizhao were two most significant people against vernacular style of writing in history". But in fact, Hu Shih and Zhang Shizhao had a big age difference; when Zhang was at work in Shanghai, Hu was only a middle school student.

Hu Shih with the May Fourth Movement 
Hu Shih was one of the founders of the May Fourth Movement, which led to some people to be a defining moment, marking the beginning of modern China. Hu had a vision of the May Fourth Movement in China as part of a global shift in philosophy, led by Western countries. The global nature of the movement, in Hu's eyes, was particularly important, given China's relatively recent status as a global power.  During the process of the May Fourth Movement, Hu's political position shifted dramatically. As fellow thinkers and students of the movement looked towards socialism, Hu also gained a more favorable view of the collective, centralized organization of groups like the Soviet Union and the Third International. After the early 1930s, however, he changed back to his earlier positions, which put more weight on individualism. During the chaotic period this movement developed, Hu felt pessimism and a sense of alienation.

Towards the end of Hu's life, he expressed disappointment at the politicization of the May Fourth Movement, which he felt was counter to the primarily philosophical and linguistic issues that drove him to find it. No matter how Hu's position shifted through the course of the Movement, he always put the May Fourth Movement in a global, albeit Eurocentric, context. Despite the implications of the May Fourth Movement, Hu Shih ultimately expressed regret that he was unable to play a larger role in his nation's history.

See also
 Modern Chinese poetry

References

Citations

Sources 

 
 
 
 
  (see online Resource listed below)
 
  Series : Harvard East Asian series 46.

Further reading
 Chan, Wing-tsit. "Hu Shih and Chinese Philosophy." Philosophy East and West 6.1 (1956): 3–12. online
 Chinese Writers on Writing featuring Hu Shih. Ed. Arthur Sze. (Trinity University Press, 2010).
 "Dr. Hu Shih, a Philosophe", by Wen Yuan-ning. Imperfect Understanding: Intimate Portraits of Modern Chinese Celebrities. Edited by Christopher Rea. (Amherst, NY: Cambria Press, 2018), pp. 41–44.
 Life of Mr.pdf Another Mr. Chabuduo English Translation at University of Southern California

External links

 "The Chinese Renaissance": a series of lectures Hu Shih delivered at the University of Chicago in the summer of 1933. (see print Reference listed above)
 "Hu Shih Study" at newconcept.com 
 "Hu Shih in The Chinese Student Club At Teachers College" at pk.tc.columbia.edu

 Hu Shih Memorial Hall in Nangang District, Taipei, Taiwan
  Hu Shi. A Portrait by Kong Kai Ming at Portrait Gallery of Chinese Writers (Hong Kong Baptist University Library).

1891 births
1962 deaths
20th-century Chinese writers
20th-century diarists
Ambassadors of China to the United States
Ambassadors of the Republic of China to the United States
Boxer Indemnity Scholarship recipients
Chinese Civil War refugees
Chinese diarists
Chinese essayists
Chinese literature academics
Chinese scholars of Buddhism
Cornell University alumni
Educators from Shanghai
Academic staff of Fu Jen Catholic University
Language reformers
Liberalism in China
Members of Academia Sinica
Members of the German Academy of Sciences at Berlin
Members of the Prussian Academy of Sciences
Ministers of Science and Technology of the Republic of China
Modern Chinese poetry
Academic staff of the National Southwestern Associated University
Academic staff of Peking University
Permanent Representatives of the Republic of China to the United Nations
Philosophers from Shanghai
Politicians of Taiwan
Presidents of Peking University
Redologists
Republic of China philosophers
Republic of China politicians from Shanghai
Taiwanese educators
Taiwanese people from Shanghai
Teachers College, Columbia University alumni
Writers from Shanghai